Cannabis in the Czech Republic is illegal for recreational use, but personal possession has been decriminalized since 1 January 2010 and medical cannabis has been legal since 1 April 2013.

Decriminalization
Possession of more than 15 grams of dry cannabis for personal use, or cultivation of more than five plants, is classed as a civil offence. However since 1 January 2010, possession of less than 15g and less than 5 plants is legal. On conviction, a fine of up to 15,000CZK can be imposed, but fines are typically much lower. Cannabis is easy to obtain at concerts and in bars. However, cannabis remains illegal, and possession of larger amounts can lead to a jail sentence of one year. Trafficking is a criminal offence, with the minimum penalty set at two years imprisonment and maximum penalty set at 18 years imprisonment, though sentences of 10–18 years are only imposed in extreme cases. A suspended sentence or other alternative punishment is usually imposed in the case of minor trafficking that does not generate a significant income.

Medical cannabis
A bill allowing cannabis to be legally available on prescription in pharmacies as a medicine was passed by the Czech Chamber of Deputies on 7 December 2012, with 126 votes for legalisation and 7 against (27 abstained and 46 were absent from the vote). The Czech Senate passed the bill on 30 January 2013. From the total of 81 senators 67 voted for legalisation and 2 voted against (5 senators abstained and 7 were absent from the vote). The bill also stipulated that only imported cannabis would be allowed for sale in the first year "to ensure standards." After that, sales may expand to include registered, domestic production that is strictly monitored.

The law came into effect on 1 April 2013 and since then medical use of cannabis has been legal and regulated in the Czech Republic. The law allows for 180 g of dry matter per month, as prescribed by specialized physicians, and can be obtained using an electronic prescription form.

References

 
Czech Republic
Politics of the Czech Republic
Society of the Czech Republic